Farrash (also Romanized as Farrâš or Farrāsh) is a village in Cham Chamal Rural District, Bisotun District, Harsin County, Kermanshah Province, Iran. As of the 2006 census, its population was 515, in 101 families.

References

Populated places in Harsin County